The 1917 Camp Lewis football team represented the United States Army's 91st Division (also known as the "Wild West Division") in the 1917 college football season. The team was based at Camp Lewis in Tacoma, Washington, and compiled a 5–2–1 record. Both losses came against California's Mare Island Marines, including a rematch in the 1918 Rose Bowl.

Camp Lewis was built in 1917 after the United States entry into World War I. By early October, 35,000 recruits from the western states were crowded into barracks there. Football games between the regiments stationed at the camp were arranged in the early autumn.

A team made up of officers from the 362nd Infantry Regiment played Washington State to a scoreless tie at Tacoma Stadium on October 13.

Later, an all-cantonment team consisting of players from the entire 91st Division was formed to represent Camp Lewis. The Camp Lewis team was coached by Lieutenant Fox Stanton, assisted by Major J. L. Weir.

Schedule

References

Camp Lewis
Camp Lewis football
Joint Base Lewis–McChord